Lobiger serradifalci is a species of small sea snail or sea slug, a marine gastropod mollusk in the family Oxynoidae.

Distribution
The type locality for this species is Sicily, Italy.

Life habits
This species feeds on the invasive algae Caulerpa taxifolia.

References

External links 
 Images of Lobiger serradifalci shells
 http://www.seaslugforum.net/factsheet/lobiserr
 bibliography for Lobiger serradifalci
 

Oxynoidae
Gastropods described in 1840